Stockel (French, former Dutch spelling) or Stokkel (Dutch) is the eastern terminus of line 1 (formerly line 1B) on the Brussels Metro. The station opened on 31 August 1988 and is located in the municipality of Woluwe-Saint-Pierre/Sint-Pieters-Woluwe, in the eastern part of Brussels, Belgium.

Art in the station
Murals on the walls across each of the tracks from the single island platform illustrate more than 140 characters from Hergé's comic The Adventures of Tintin. The sketches for the work were made by the artist himself, just before his death. The figures were drawn by Studio Hergé.

Surroundings
Next to the subway station, there is a shopping centre named Stockel Square, home to various shops including clothing, jewellery, food, etc. In front of the station, there is also a cinema called Le New Stockel.

References

Notes

External links

Brussels metro stations
Railway stations opened in 1988
Woluwe-Saint-Pierre